The Honours (Equality of Titles for Partners) Bill 2012-13 was a private member's bill which would allow men who are married or civilly-partnered to peers, baronets, baronetesses, knights or dames of either sex to receive honours and the title "The Honourable" by way of their relationship statuses. The bill failed to pass beyond first reading.

See also
 Equality (Titles) Bill
 Succession to Peerages Bill (2015–16)
 Succession to Peerages Bill (2016–17)

References

External links
 2012-13 

2012 in British politics